The 1921 Washington & Jefferson Presidents football team represented the Washington & Jefferson College during the 1921 college football season.  Coached by Greasy Neale, went 10–0 in the regular season, defeating Pitt, University of Detroit, and Syracuse. The 7–0 victory over rival Pitt was celebrated with a day of canceled classes and a bonfire with inspirational speeches in front of the Washington County Courthouse. As the best team from the east, W&J was invited to the 1922 Rose Bowl to play the best team from the west: the undefeated and heavily favored California Golden Bears. Some had even begun to call Cal the best team in college football history.  The Red and Black sent 20 men on the cross-country trip and Robert M. Murphy mortgaged his home to pay his six family members’ way. W&J would be the last Rose Bowl team to play the same 11 men the entire game. During the train ride to Pasadena, in which Greasy Neale continued to prepare his men, Lee Spillers caught pneumonia and could not finish the journey. Ross "Bucky" Buchannan, a reserve player who had stowed away on the train and was fed smuggled sandwiches during the trip, was available to fill Spillers' roster spot.

Cal had outscored their opponents that season by a margin of 312–33; nevertheless, the W&J defense held the Golden Bears' potent offense, led by Brick Muller, to no points, 2 first downs, no completed passes, and only 49 yards rushing. In one of the most disputed plays in Rose Bowl history, a rushing touchdown for W&J was overturned for an offside penalty called on Wayne Brenkert.  On another play, W&J's Hal Erickson slipped and fell on his way to scoring a sure touchdown.  The contest ended in a scoreless draw.  The game was notable as the last time a "small school" would be represented in the Rose Bowl. W&J's team featured two Rose Bowl firsts: Herb Kopf was the first freshman to play and Charlie "Pruner" West was the first African American to play quarterback.  W&J's team captain, Russ Stein, was inducted into the Rose Bowl Hall of Fame in 1991. The Red and Black finished the season with a share of the 1921 national championship, as later determined by the Boand System.

Schedule

References

Washington and Jefferson
Washington & Jefferson Presidents football seasons
College football undefeated seasons
College football national champions
Washington and Jefferson Presidents football